Erica is an interactive film video game developed and published by Flavourworks. The game was originally released for the PlayStation 4 by Sony Interactive Entertainment on August 19, 2019. It was later ported to iOS and released on January 15, 2021, while a version for Microsoft Windows was released on May 25, 2021.

Gameplay
The game is an interactive fiction thriller, wherein the player makes choices at critical story junctures to steer which branch of the narrative will unfold. Erica can be played using a companion app on a smartphone using PlayLink, or using the touch pad on a PlayStation 4 Controller.

Plot
The game stars Holly Earl as Erica Mason, a young woman grappling with nightmares from her childhood and trying to unravel the truth of her family's occult past. The narrative begins with Erica reliving her father's murder and attempting to identify his killer from these visions. When she receives a severed hand in the mail from a mysterious sender, Erica makes contact with the police and returns temporarily to Delphi House, an asylum with which her parents worked when they were alive. There, she meets people from her father's past, as well as several young women staying at Delphi House, and begins to unravel the mystery behind Delphi House, her father's killing, and a mysterious symbol which appears throughout the game.

Reception
Erica received mostly positive reviews, though Metacritic attributes it an aggregated score of 69/100 from 40 critic reviews. Erica's musical score, composed by Austin Wintory, was nominated for "original composition" awards at the 23rd Annual D.I.C.E. Awards and the 2019 International Film Music Critics Association Awards.

References

External links
 

2010s interactive fiction
2019 video games
Full motion video based games
Interactive movie video games
London Studio games
PlayStation 4 games
Single-player video games
Sony Interactive Entertainment games
Video games developed in the United Kingdom
Video games featuring female protagonists
Video games scored by Austin Wintory